Introduction to Leadership Skills for Crews is the first level leadership development course for Venturers in the Boy Scouts of America's Venturing program for older youth (14-21). It replaced the Venturing Leadership Skills Course in 2014.  While the course is expected to be put on by a crew (ideally by the officers and adult advisors), many councils/districts put on ILSC courses (hopefully led mainly by experienced Venturers) for their Crews. This is done mainly because many crews are too small to effectively put on the course themselves.

Format

ILSC helps crew members with leadership positions to learn about their new roles and how to most effectively reach success in that role. It is intended to help Venturers in leadership positions within their crew understand their responsibilities and to equip them with organizational and leadership skills.

The program is an introductory course that prepares participants to attend National Youth Leadership Training, National Advanced Youth Leadership Experience, and optionally Kodiak. The course is designed to be conducted in a retreat setting running from Friday evening through Saturday night. Some groups will offer a weekend version by adding such activities as Project COPE or more examples.

The ILSC course is divided into three modules:
 Unit Organization
 Tools of the Trade
 Leadership and Teamwork

Once completed, Venturers are presented with a "Trained" strip patch, which is worn on their uniform, left sleeve, below their office patch (or where one will be). Even if the Venturer is not an officer, they still wear the patch.

After completing ILSC, Venturers are encouraged to continue their leadership development by attending National Youth Leadership Training or a Kodiak leadership development trek. ILSC is considered the first stage of the overall Venturing youth leadership development program called Nature of Leadership.

References

 ILSC Syllabus

External links
 Venturing BSA
 ILSC Syllabus

Leadership training of the Boy Scouts of America